The Portland Observer is one of the oldest African-American newspapers in Oregon. Established in 1970, it is published weekly (on Wednesdays), in Portland, Oregon. Rev. Alfred L. Henderson founded the paper in the 1970s, in the tradition of the People's Observer, a 1940s publication that had ceased publication in 1950. That paper also originally went by the name of "Portland Observer."

Historic Portland Observer 
The Portland Observer was launched by William H. McClendonn in 1938, but due to the Great Depression, folded in 1939. 

Another paper had the same title in Portland, Michigan, from 1876 into the 20th century.

Post-1980s 
After several changes in ownership, the Washington family acquired the paper in the 1980s, during which Joyce Washington helmed the publication. Upon her death, Washington's son Charles "Chuck" Washington, a Portland native and a graduate of Jefferson High School, briefly took over as publisher until his death in December 2012. The paper was then passed on to Mark Washington who controls the paper today. Portland politician, radio host, restaurateur, and veteran Bruce Broussard has held a leadership position at the paper. Additionally, Albert Williams is currently the general manager of the Portland Observer and is involved in many aspects including hiring, editing, writing, advertising, and editing. In their website, they state their key focus of bringing stories focused on "education, health, politics, and law and justice" to their readers.

References

External links 
 Portland Observer

1970 establishments in Oregon
African-American history in Portland, Oregon
African-American newspapers
Newspapers published in Portland, Oregon
Publications established in 1970
Weekly newspapers published in the United States